Qasem Qeshlaqi (also Romanized as Qāsem Qeshlāq; also known as Ḩājjī Salīm-e Qeshlāqī) is a village in Balghelu Rural District, in the Central District of Ardabil County, Ardabil Province, Iran. At the 2006 census, its population was 131, in 36 families.

References 

Towns and villages in Ardabil County